This is a list of diplomatic missions in Cameroon. The capital Yaoundé currently hosts 39 embassies/high commissions.  Douala, the largest city and main economic center, hosts six consulates/consulates general.

Diplomatic missions in Yaoundé

Embassies and High Commissions

Other missions or delegations 
 (Delegation)

Consular Missions

Douala
 
 (Consulate)
 

 (Consulate-General)
 (Embassy branch office)

Buea
 (Consulate-General)

Garoua
 (Consulate)
 (Consulate)

Ebolowa
 (Consulate General)

Embassies to open

Non-resident embassies and high commissions accredited to Cameroon
Resident in Abuja, Nigeria:

Resident in Kinshasa, Congo-Kinshasa:

Resident elsewhere

Closed missions

See also
Foreign relations of Cameroon
List of diplomatic missions of Cameroon
Visa requirements for Cameroonian citizens

References

External links
République du cameroun - Services du Premier Ministre 

Cameroon
Diplomatic missions
Foreign relations of Cameroon